Richard W. Kenyon (born 1964) is an American mathematician known for his contributions in combinatorics and probability theory. He is the Erastus L. DeForest Professor of Mathematics at Yale University.

Kenyon graduated from Rice University and then earned his PhD under supervision of William Thurston at Princeton University. He won the Rollo Davidson Prize in 2001 and the Loève Prize in 2007. In 2014 Kenyon was chosen as a Simons Investigator and inducted into the American Academy of Arts and Sciences. In 2018, he was an invited speaker at the International Congress of Mathematicians in Rio de Janeiro.

References

External links 
 Website at Yale University
 
 
 

1964 births
Living people
20th-century American mathematicians
Rice University alumni
Princeton University alumni
Yale University faculty
Probability theorists
Simons Investigator
21st-century American mathematicians